Parsifal Bassi (1892–1960) was an Italian actor, screenwriter and film director.

Selected filmography
 La porta del mondo (1921)
 Anadiomene (1922)
 Cardinal Lambertini (1934)
 Rossini (1942)
 Gioco d'azzardo (1943)

References

Bibliography
 Mancini, Elaine. Struggles of the Italian film industry during fascism, 1930-1935. UMI Research Press, 1985.

External links

1892 births
1960 deaths
Italian film directors
Italian male film actors
20th-century Italian screenwriters
Film people from Bologna
Actors from Bologna